A list of places of worship in London was compiled for William Maitland's 1739 History of London. It is thought to be the first such list published that goes beyond Church of England churches and chapels, to include the full variety of religions practised formally in London. The list then appeared in other publications, for two decades at least, without regard to updating.

By denominations, it divides as below.

Church of England
Listed 76 churches, 68 chapels.

Allhallows, Barking Incumbent William Geekie (1733–1767)
Allhallows, Bread Street apparently no incumbent
Allhallows the Great Incumbent Christopher Hussey (1732–1761)
Allhallows, Lombard Street 
Allhallows, London Wall
Allhallows Staining
St Alphage, Aldermanbury
St Andrew Holborn
St Andrew Undershaft St Andrew Undershaft With St Mary Axe, Location 11558;  Berriman, William (1712 - 1762), inc. 26/04/1722 - 15/05/1762 ) ID 7677
St Andrew Wardrobe 
St Anne Aldersgate
St Antholin Budge Row
St Augustin Watling Street
St Bartholomew Exchange
St Bartholomew the Great, Smithfield Richard Thomas Bateman
St Bartholomew the Less Smithfield
St Benedict Fink
St Bennet Gracechurch
St Bennet Paul's Wharf
St Botolph Aldersgate
St Botolph Aldgate
St Botolph Bishopsgate
St Bride Fleet Street
Christ Church Newgate Street
St Christopher Threadneedle Street
St Clement Eastcheap
St Dionis Backchurch
St Dunstan in the East
St Dunstan in the West
St Edmund Lombard Street
St Ethelburg Bishopgate Street
St George Botolph Lane
St Giles Cripplegate
St Helen Bishopgate Street
St James, Duke's Place
St James Garlick Hill
St Katherine Coleman Fenchurch Street
St Katherine Cree
St Katherine near the Tower
St Lawrence Jewry
St Magnus London Bridge
St Margaret Lothbury
St Margaret Pattens
St Martin Ludgate
St Martin Outwitch
St Mary Abchurch
St Mary Aldermanbury
St Mary Aldermary
St Mary le Bow
St Mary at Hill
St Mary Magdalen, Old Fish Street
St Mary Somerset
St Mary Woolnoth
St Matthew Friday Street
St Michael Bassishaw
St Michael Cornhill
St Michael Crooked Lane
St Michael Queenhithe
St Michael Royal
St Michael Wood Street
St Mildred Bread Street
St Mildred Poultry
St Nicholas Cole Abbey
St Olave Hart Street
St Olave Jewry
St Peter ad Vincula
St Peter Cornhill
St Peter Le Poor
St Sepulchre Snow Hill
St Stephen Coleman Street
St Stephen Walbrook
St Swithin Walbrook
Temple Church
Trinity Minories
St Vedast Foster Lane
St Anne Dean Street
St Clement Dane
St George Hanover Square
St James Piccadilly
St John Baptist, the Savoy
St John the Evangelist Horseferry
St Margaret, Westminster
St Martin, St Martin's Lane
St Mary le Strand
St Paul Covent Garden
Christ Church, Spitalfields
St Anne Limehouse
St Dunstan, Stepney
St George Bloomsbury
St George Queen Square
St George, Middlesex
St Giles in the Field
St James Clerkenwell
St John Hackney
St John Wapping
St Leonard Shoreditch
St Luke Old Street
St Mary Islington
St Mary Whitechapel
St Paul Shadwell
(St Catherine's by the Tower

Presbyterians
Listed 28 meeting houses.

Bethnal Green meeting: (de facto Independent) William Chapman, moved here from Lower Rotherhithe in 1704, to 1738; and William Sheffield from 1739. Chapman was the son of Samuel Chapman, an ejected minister of 1662 who later conformed. Sheffield was minister to 1755.
Book House meeting, Clapton
Church Street meeting, Hoxton
Crosby Square meeting, Bishopsgate Street
Crown Court meeting, Russell Street
Founders Hall meeting, Lothbury
Gravel Lane meeting, Houndsditch; Gravel Pit Chapel, George Smith
Great St Thomas Apostles meeting
Hanover Street meeting, Longacre
King's Weigh-house meeting, Little Eastcheap
Leather Lane meeting, Holborn; Joshua Bayes from 1723 (ODNb)
Little Carter Lane meeting, Samuel Wright at Carter Lane (ODNB)
Little St. Helens meeting, Bishopgate Street
Maiden Lane meeting, Deadman's Place
Middlesex Court meeting, Bartholomew Close
Mourning Lane meeting, Hackney
New Broad Street meeting, London Wall
Old Bailey meeting
Old Jewry meeting, Poultry; Old Jewry Meeting-house, Samuel Chandler
Parish Street meeting, Horsleydown
Poor Jewry Lane meeting, near Aldgate; William Harris, replaced 1740 by George Benson (ODNB)
Rampant Lion Yard meeting, Nightingale Lane
Salters Hall meeting, Swithin's Lane
Shakespear's Walk meeting, Upper Shadwell
Silver Street meeting, Wood Street
Swallow Street meeting, Piccadilly; James Anderson 1734 to Lisle Street chapel, Leicester Fields
Windsor Court meeting, Monkwell Street

Independents
Listed 26 meeting houses.

Boar's Head Yard meeting, Petticoat Lane
Brickhill Lane meeting, Thames Street
Broad Street meeting, near Old Gravel Lane
Court Yard meeting, Barnaby Street
Deadman's Place meeting, Southwark
Hare Court meeting, Aldersgate Street
Jewin Street meeting, Aldersgate Street
Mare Street meeting, Hackney
Nevil's Alley meeting, Fetter Lane
New Broad Street meeting, Moorfields
New Court meeting, Cary Street; Thomas Bradbury from 1728 (ODNB)
Orchard meeting, Wapping
Paved Alley meeting, Lime Street
Pavement Row meeting, Moorfields
Pinner Hall meeting, Broad Street
Queen Street meeting, Ratcliff
Queen Street meeting, Rotherhithe
Red Cross Street meeting, Fore Street; Samuel Stockell 1728 to 1750
Ropemaker's Alley meeting, Little Moorfields
St Michael's Lane meeting, Cannon Street
St Saviour's Dockhead meeting, Southwark
Staining Lane meeting, Maiden Lane
Stepney meeting, Stepney Fields
Turners Hall meeting, Philpot Lane
White Horse Yard meeting, Duke's Place
Zoar Street meeting, Southwark

Baptists
Listed 33 meeting houses.

St John's Court Street meeting, Little Hart Street; Hart Street closed around 1738
John Gill at Horselydown, Southwark, from 1720 (ODNB)

Quakers
Listed 12 meeting houses.
Bull and Mouth meeting, St Martin's Le Grand
Ewer Street meeting, Southwark
Fair Street meeting, Horsleydown
Little Almonry meeting, Westminster
Peel meeting, St John's Lane
Quaker Street meeting, Spitalfields
Sandy's Court meeting, Houndsditch
School House Lane meeting, Ratcliff
Savoy meeting, The Strand
Wapping meeting, Wapping
White Hart Yard meeting, Gracechurch Street
Workhouse meeting, Clerkenwell

Scottish Presbyterians
Listed three meeting houses.

Chapels of Embassies
Listed six Catholic chapels.

Other denominations
Chapels: one Catholic, three non-juror, two Muggletonian, two Camisard, meeting of Orator Henley.

Stranger churches
Listed 21 Huguenot chapels, two Dutch churches, three Lutheran churches. Plus Danish, Swedish and Russian churches.

Synagogues
Listed three synagogues

See also
 List of places of worship in London, 1804

Notes
Source: https://archive.org/stream/universalpocket00unkngoog#page/n48/mode/2up

References

1738 in Christianity
Lists of religious buildings and structures in London
History of Christianity in England